William Thompson (1733–1799) was the first President of the Methodist Conference after John Wesley's death, being elected President at the Manchester conference in 1791.

Life
Thompson was born in 1733 at Newtownbutler in County Fermanagh, Ireland. He entered the Wesleyan itinerancy in 1757.

During his early ministry he endured persecution including imprisonment and the impressment of several of his hearers into the Royal Navy. They were subsequently released through the intervention of the Lady Huntingdon.

After his term as President of the Methodist Conference, Thompson was involved with the sacramental controversy of the early 1790s. His pen drafted the Plan of Pacification of 1795, which arose out of disputes between the Methodist societies and the Church of England over the status of travelling preachers and the administration of the sacraments, fomenting their separation.

He was serving as Chairman of the Birmingham District when he died on 1 May 1799.

He was buried at St Mary's Church, Whittall Street, Birmingham (demolished in the late 1920s). A tablet, formerly in that church, and now in St Martin in the Bull Ring, reads:

References

External links 
 Methodist Collections University of Manchester Library

1733 births
1799 deaths
Presidents of the Methodist Conference
People from Birmingham, West Midlands
People from County Fermanagh